Sigvald Tveit (14 March 1945 – 8 January 2019) was a Norwegian composer and musicologist. 

Born in Nissedal, Tveit studied at the University of Oslo and the Norwegian Academy of Music, and was appointed at the University of Oslo from 1972. From 1984 he was associate professor. His compositions include music for the television series Sesam Stasjon and Portveien 2, and other shows. His musical plays include Visst skal våren komme (1983), Det gode landet (1986), Livstreet (1994), and Pilgrimen (1997).

He died in Oslo on 8 January 2019.

Selected works

References

Further reading

1945 births
2019 deaths
Norwegian composers
Norwegian musicologists
University of Oslo alumni
Norwegian Academy of Music alumni
Academic staff of the University of Oslo